Swedish Emigrant Institute (Swedish: Svenska Emigrantinstitutet) was a research center and museum designed to preserve records and memorabilia relating to Swedish-American migration.

Background
The Swedish Emigrant Institute was founded on September 11, 1965.  The Swedish Emigrant Institute is located in the House of Emigrants (Swedish: Utvandrarnas hus) located in Växjö in Småland, Sweden. Its purpose is to collect and register source material dealing with Swedish emigration. This building contains a Research Center with Archives, a Library and Museums all of which focus on the peak  period of Swedish Migration to North America. The Institute houses a large collection of emigration history including archival materials and library references, provides assistance in genealogical research, sponsors scholarly research and academic conferences, and mounts exhibitions on migration to and from Sweden.

The Institute was supported by Swedish author Vilhelm Moberg who donated the complete source material from his famous Emigrant Series which told the saga of Karl Oskar and Kristina’s immigration from Småland to Chisago County, Minnesota. This unique collection of Moberg memorabilia also includes Axel Olsson's sculpture entitled The Emigrants which portrays the main characters featured in the novels.

Museum Exhibitions
The Dream of America -  This museum tells the story of Swedish emigration to America, reflecting the background, cause and result of the mass exodus of Swedes between 1843 - 1930.
The Moberg Room - This museum illustrates the 12 years of work that Vilhelm Moberg spent writing his immortal emigrant novels. On exhibit are Moberg’s original manuscripts, excerpts, notes, photographs and other documents.
The Research Center and Archives - The manuscript collection consists of original documents, microfilms, sound recordings and photographs. The repository consists of thousands of documents, including the Vilhelm Moberg collection.
The Library -  This facility contains Sweden's most complete book collection on emigration.

Main Collection
The main collections available in the Swedish Emigrant Institute dealing with emigration research and other source materials are: 
 Swedish parish records 
 Swedish passenger lists 
 Swedish American church archives 
 America letters and diaries 
 Passport journals; summary census reports from various parish offices 
 Emigrant organizational archives of lodges in most sizable Swedish settlements and mutual aid societies 
 Printed source materials dealing with emigration and Swedish pioneer settlers such as autobiographies, oral history and literature from Swedish emigrant communities

References

External links
Svenska Emigrantinstitutet) Official Website  
Review of Swedish Emigration to America

Museums established in 1965
Art museums and galleries in Sweden
Swedish migration to North America
Museums in Kronoberg County
History museums in Sweden
Museums of human migration